The Cipero Marl is a geologic formation in Trinidad and Tobago. It preserves fossils dating back to the Early Oligocene to Burdigalian period.

See also 
 List of fossiliferous stratigraphic units in Trinidad and Tobago

References

Further reading 
 R. M. Stainforth. 1948. Description, correlation, and paleoecology of Tertiary Cipero Marl, Trinidad, BWI. Bulletin of the American Association of Petroleum Geologists 32(7):1292-1330

Geologic formations of Trinidad and Tobago
Neogene Trinidad and Tobago
Paleogene Trinidad and Tobago
Marl formations
Shallow marine deposits